The first election to Gwynedd County Council (at the time known as Caernarfonshire and Merionethshire County Council) was held on 4 May 1995. It was followed by the 1999 election. Results are drawn from the national press.

Overview
The previous Gwynedd Council had an Independent majority but Plaid Cymru secured control of the new authority.

Summary of Results

|}

Ward Results (Arfon)

Bethel (one seat)

Bontnewydd (one seat)

Cadnant (one seat)

Deiniol (one seat)

Deiniolen (one seat)

Dewi (one seat)

Garth (one seat)

Gerlan (one seat)

Glyder (one seat)

Hendre (one seat)

Llanberis (one seat)

Llanllyfni (one seat)

Ward Results (Dwyfor)

Ward Results (Meirionnydd)

References 

1995
1995 Welsh local elections